Siku Dalam Seribu is a song written by Depha Masterpiece and recorded as a duet between him and singer, Allyssa Joanne or better known as Lyssa Jean. The lyrics essentially describes about a woman who learned to accept and open up to a new relationship after being hurt. She was told by the man, that she may not be his first love, but he promised her solemnly that he will love her unconditionally.

The song was recorded at Masterjam Studio and Majestic Media Production in 2015, also included in Masterpiece album, Ngarap Ka Nuan Nikal Pulai in 2016. The song became Masterpiece second biggest hit from the album after its first single, "Ngarap Ka Nuan Nikal Pulai". "Siku Dalam Seribu" earned the band & Lyssa Jean two awards for 'Best Stage Performance' and first runner-up for 'Best Song' at the 2017 ACSJ Music Awards, in Betong, Sarawak, on 23 September 2017.

Track listing
 "Siku Dalam Seribu" (Album Version) - 5:03
 "Siku Dalam Seribu" (Radio Edit) - 4:51

Music video
The music video was filmed in Kuching and Sibu, Sarawak, by Brodie William, director of Do Records Entertainment.  It was shot at two locations in Kuching; One scene shows Depha and Lyssa performing the song at Betarak Mayau cafe in Kuching. It then blend with another scene where the band performing separately at one bar in Sibu.

Credits

Masterpiece
 Depha Masterpiece – vocals, songwriter
 Kennedy Edwin – guitars
 Willy Edwin – guitars, recording technician
 Roslee Qadir – keyboards
 Valentine Jimmy – keyboards
 Watt Marcus – bass guitar
 Harold Vincent – drums
Guest singer
 Lyssa Jean 
Production
 Recorded at Masterjam Studio, Sibu and Majestic Media Production, Bintulu, Malaysia
 Mixed and mastered at iMusik Studio, Sibu
 Engineered by Iskandar Bujang
 Videography: Brodie William @ DO Records Entertainment
 Producer: Embat Lala, Panggau Buluh Pengerindu Records, Sibu

References

External links
 Lyrics of this song on Lirik Lagu Iban
 Guitar chord of this song on Chordify
 

2015 songs
Rock ballads
Masterpiece (band) songs